Nasser Abdulsalam Al Ahrak (born 5 January 1999), also known as Nasser Abdulsalam, is a Qatari professional footballer who plays as a midfielder for Qatar Stars League side Al-Gharafa.

Career statistics

Club

Notes

References

External links

1999 births
Living people
Qatari footballers
Qatari expatriate footballers
Cultural Leonesa footballers
Al-Gharafa SC players
Al-Khor SC players
Qatar Stars League players
Association football midfielders
Qatari expatriate sportspeople in Spain
Expatriate footballers in Spain
Qatar youth international footballers
Qatar under-20 international footballers